The 2nd//11th (County Armagh) Battalion, Ulster Defence Regiment was formed in 1991 as a result of an amalgamation between the 2nd Battalion Ulster Defence Regiment and the 11th Battalion Ulster Defence Regiment.  The resultant 2/11 UDR was subsumed into the Royal Irish Rangers in 1992 as part of the Options for Change amalgamations and was renamed the 6th Battalion Royal Irish Regiment.

Uniform, armament & equipment

Greenfinches

Notable personnel
 :Category:Ulster Defence Regiment soldiers
 :Category:Ulster Defence Regiment officers

Bibliography

 A Testimony to Courage – the Regimental History of the Ulster Defence Regiment 1969 – 1992, John Potter, Pen & Sword Books Ltd, 2001, 
 The Ulster Defence Regiment: An Instrument of Peace?, Chris Ryder 1991 
  Lost Lives, David McKittrick, Mainstream, 2004, 

1991 establishments in the United Kingdom
1992 disestablishments in the United Kingdom
Battalions of the Ulster Defence Regiment
Military history of County Armagh
Military units and formations disestablished in 1992
Military units and formations established in 1991